Os is a municipality in Innlandet county, Norway. It is located in the traditional district of Østerdalen. The administrative centre of the municipality is the village of Os i Østerdalen. The municipality is located to the west of the municipality of Røros and to the south of the municipalities of Midtre Gauldal and Holtålen in Trøndelag county. In Innlandet county, Os is located to the west of the municipality of Tolga and to the north of the municipality of Engerdal.

The  municipality is the 110th largest by area out of the 356 municipalities in Norway. Os is the 288th most populous municipality in Norway with a population of 1,855.

General information

The parish of Os was historically part of Tolga Municipality. On 1 July 1926 the parish of Os (population: 1,936) was separated from Tolga to become a separate municipality. In 1927, a small area of Tolga (population: 18) was transferred to the municipality of Os. During the 1960s, there were many municipal mergers across Norway due to the work of the Schei Committee. On 1 January 1966, the municipality of Os (population: 2,015) was merged with the municipality of Tolga (population: 1,944) to form the new municipality of Tolga-Os. This arrangement was not well-liked by the local residents so after a few years, the municipalities began to ask to undo the merger. On 1 January 1976, the merger was reversed and the municipalities of Os (population: 1,859) and Tolga (population: 1,865) were re-established using their old boundaries.

Name
The municipality (originally the parish) is named after the old Os farm, since the first Os Church was built here in 1703. The name is identical with the word  which means "mouth of a river" (here it is referring to the Vangrøfta river running out into the Glomma river).

Coat of arms
The coat of arms was granted on 17 December 1992. The arms show three gold cowbells on a green background. It symbolizes the traditional and modern businesses in the municipality.

Churches
The Church of Norway has three parishes within the municipality of Os. It is part of the Nord-Østerdal prosti (deanery) in the Diocese of Hamar.

Government
All municipalities in Norway, including Os, are responsible for primary education (through 10th grade), outpatient health services, senior citizen services, unemployment and other social services, zoning, economic development, and municipal roads. The municipality is governed by a municipal council of elected representatives, which in turn elects a mayor. The municipality falls under the Østre Innlandet District Court and the Eidsivating Court of Appeal.

Municipal council
The municipal council  of Os is made up of 15 representatives that are elected to four year terms. The party breakdown of the council is as follows:

Mayor
The mayors of Os (incomplete list):
2015–present: Runa Finborud (Sp)
2011-2015: Arnfinn Nergård (Sp)
2007-2011: Arne Grue (Ap)
1995-2007: Arnfinn Nergård (Sp)

Geography
Lakes in the region include Flensjøen, Femunden, and Siksjøen. The mountains Forollhogna and Håmmålsfjellet are located in Os. The large river Glomma runs through the northern part of the municipality.

Notable people 
 Arnfinn Nergård (born 1952) is a Norwegian politician, Mayor of Os & county Mayor of Hedmark

Sport 
 Annar Ryen (1909 in Os – 1985) a Norwegian cross-country skier
 Viggo Sundmoen (born 1954 in Os) a Norwegian former footballer with 150 club caps
 Randi Langøigjelten (born 1957) a retired Norwegian middle-distance runner
 Therese Johaug (born 1988 in Os) a Norwegian cross-country skier and three-time Olympic medallist
 Jon Aukrust Osmoen (born 1992 in Os) a Norwegian orienteering competitor

References

External links

Municipal fact sheet from Statistics Norway 

 
Municipalities of Innlandet
1926 establishments in Norway
1966 disestablishments in Norway
1976 establishments in Norway